Rüdinger is a German surname. Notable people with the surname include:

Alex Rüdinger (born 1991), American drummer
Nikolaus Rüdinger (1832–1896), German anatomist

See also
Rüdiger

German-language surnames